Bryan Coast is a portion of the coast of Antarctica along the south shore of the Bellingshausen Sea between Pfrogner Point and the northern tip of the Rydberg Peninsula. To the west is Eights Coast, and to the east is English Coast. The eastern end of this coast was discovered from the air during flights of the United States Antarctic Service (1939–41) and the Ronne Antarctic Research Expedition (1947–48). The entire coast was mapped by the United States Geological Survey from surveys and from U.S. Navy air photos, 1961–67. Originally named George Bryan Coast after R. Admiral George S. Bryan, Hydrographer of the U.S. Navy, 1938–46, under whose direction noteworthy contributions to polar geography were made, the name has been shortened for the sake of brevity.

References
 

Coasts of Antarctica
Landforms of Ellsworth Land